Chayamaritia is a genus of flowering plants belonging to the family Gesneriaceae.

Its native range is Indo-China.

Species:

Chayamaritia banksiae 
Chayamaritia smitinandii

References

Didymocarpoideae
Gesneriaceae genera